Jelenie may refer to the following places:
Jelenie, Greater Poland Voivodeship (west-central Poland)
Jelenie, Masovian Voivodeship (east-central Poland)
Jelenie, West Pomeranian Voivodeship (north-west Poland)